E115 may refer to: 

 European route E115
 Element 115, moscovium (Mc) 
 A Battery electric vehicle SUV concept car: Hongqi § Concept cars